Bernd Clüver (10 April 1948 in Hildesheim – 28 July 2011 in Palma, Spain) was a German singer.

Life 
Clüver became a famous German Schlager singer in Germany and had several hits during the 1970s. His best-known song is perhaps Der Junge mit der Mundharmonika which placed No. 1 in German Charts during 1973. He died after a fall down from the stairs at his home in Mallorca.

Awards 

 1973 Goldene Europa
 1974 Goldene Europa
 1981: Goldene Stimmgabel
 1985: Goldene Stimmgabel
 1991: Goldene Stimmgabel

External links 
  
 Stern:Seebestattung:Bernd Clüver findet letzte Ruhe auf Hoher See (german)

German male singers
Schlager musicians
1948 births
2011 deaths
People from Hildesheim
20th-century German musicians
Accidental deaths from falls
20th-century German male musicians